The Culiacán River is a river that is formed at the confluence of the Tamazula River and Humaya River, located in Culiacán city of Sinaloa state, in northwestern Mexico.

The river flows from the Sierra Madre Occidental headwaters confluence generally westwards and down into the Gulf of California of the Pacific Ocean.

See also
Mexican golden trout — endemic to the headwaters area of this and several other rivers in the Sierra Madre Occidental.
List of longest rivers of Mexico

References

Rivers of Sinaloa
Rivers of the Gulf of California
Rivers of the Sierra Madre Occidental
Rivers of Mexico